Eoophyla pentopalis is a moth in the family Crambidae first described by George Hampson in 1906. It is found in Sierra Leone.

The wingspan is 12–14 mm. The forewings are whitish to pale ochreous with a fuscous median fascia and a parallel line. There are two white wedge-shaped costal strigulae separated by orange brown. The base of the hindwings is white, with a yellow streak up to the tornus.

References

Eoophyla
Moths of Africa